The 2004 Scott Tournament of Hearts was held at the ENMAX Centrium in Red Deer, Alberta from February 21 to 29 2004. The Colleen Jones rink returned as Team Canada, going on to win their fourth straight Hearts, then representing Canada at the 2004 Ford World Curling Championship where they won gold.

Teams

Standings

Results
All times local (Mountain Time Zone, MT)

Draw 1
February 21, 2:00 PM MT

Draw 2
February 21, 6:30 PM MT

Draw 3
February 22, 8:30 AM MT

Draw 4
February 22, 1:00 PM MT

Draw 5
February 22, 6:00 PM MT

Draw 6
February 23, 8:30 AM MT

Draw 7
February 23, 1:00 PM MT

Draw 8
February 23, 6:00 PM MT

Draw 9
February 24, 8:30 AM MT

Draw 10
February 24, 1:00 PM MT

Draw 11
February 24, 6:00 PM MT

Draw 12
February 25, 8:30 AM MT

Draw 13
February 25, 1:00 PM MT

Draw 14
February 25, 6:00 PM MT

Draw 15
February 26, 8:30 AM MT

Draw 16
February 26, 1:00 PM MT

Draw 17
February 26, 6:00 PM MT

Tiebreaker 
February 27, 8:30 AM MT

Playoffs

1 vs. 2
February 27, 6:00 PM MT

3 vs. 4
February 27, 1:00 PM MT

Semi-final
February 28, 6:00 PM ET

Final
February 29, 1:00 PM MT

Notes

References

Scotties Tournament of Hearts
Scott Tournament Of Hearts
Sports competitions in Red Deer, Alberta
Curling competitions in Alberta
2004 in Alberta
2004 in women's curling